Pattiyage Robin Steven Fernando (born 15 June 1937 – died 8 January 2022 as රොබින් ප්‍රනාන්දු in [Sinhala]), popularly as Robin Fernando, was an actor in Sri Lankan cinema and television as well as a stunt coordinator. Considered as one of the best stunt directors in Sinhala cinema, Fernando started his career in the 1965 film  Chandiya, and rose to prominence with lead roles.

Early life and education
Fernando was born on 15 June 1937 at Kotahena, Sri Lanka as the third of the family. His father Cyril Anthony served in Department of Printing and as Chief Foreman in the Printing Division of the M.D. Gunasena Company. His mother Vilet Anthony was a housewife. He had two elder sisters and two younger sisters. A Buddhist devotee, Fernando never gave up going to the Dhamma School at Deepaduttaramaya in Kotahena on every Sundays.

He completed his education from St. Benedict's College, Colombo during the period that World War II occurred. He took national colors for sports such as karate and gymnastics as well. After leaving school in 1963, he went to work for the Mackwood Company in Colombo.

Career
Fernando was introduced to film director Titus Thotawatte by Ariyaratne Kahawita. His first role came through Hingana Kolla, as an uncredited stuntman. He was chosen to film Chandiya by Ariyaratne Kahavita. According to Fernando, his first cinema acting came through Chandiya, but it was screened in 1965 after his second film Dheewarayo was screened in 1964. He has acted in more than 80 Sinhala films since his debut acting in 1965 film Chandiya. Until the film Sagarika, Fernando starred in Thotawatte's films. Although he entered as a martial artist, he was not centered in it. His most adventurous fight scene after Chandiya was in the films Kapatikama and Kauda Hari.

Fernando pointed out that stunt is an art when every time he gets a chance at the films like Bicycle Horā, Ohoma Hondada and Pēnava Nēda. The 1971 film Dævena Pipāsa made his first lead role. By that time he had shown his talent through the sub-main characters such as the role "Raja" in another 1971 film Hāralakṣe with one of his most satirical characters. Films such as Nivena Ginna, Apēkṣā, Veera Puran Appu were among Robin's most acclaimed films. The song "Soduru Lowata Mal Wehala" which he sang with Geetha Kumarasinghe in the 1978 film Apeksha is one of the most popular songs in Sinhala cinema. In that film, the terrible fight with Ranjan Mendis was also one of the most adventurous fights in Sinhala cinema. In 1983, Fernando directed his first film Sura Doothiyo, which was based on real incidents. His last direction came through Ninja Sri Lanka.

His first television acting came through Sriyani Amarasena's Ira Batu Tharuwa, which was shot in England. Some of the other television serials of Robin Fernando include, Chandramaya, Hangimuttam, Paradeesaya and Damini.

Personal life and death
Fernando married his partner Violet Jayaweera on 14 October 1964 and they had one son: Channa and one daughter Eranthika. He met Violet in 1962. Fernando died on 8 January 2022, at the age of 84. He had been receiving treatment for Parkinson's disease for nearly two years.

Filmography
 No. denotes the Number of Sri Lankan film in the Sri Lankan cinema.

Television
Fernando has also acted in many television serials.

 Bogala Sawundiris 
 Bopath Sakkiya
 Chandramaya
 Damini
 Hangimuththan
 Hima Rathriya
 Ira Batu Tharuwa
 Paradeesaya
 Pingala Danawwa
 Pushparaga 
 Samudra Chaya
 Sangramaya
 Sarisara Lihini 
 Sekku Gedara
 Urumaya Soya
 Wansakkarayo
 Wassanaye Hiru Evidin

References

External links 
 
රොබින් ප්‍රනාන්දුගේ 75 වැනි ජන්ම දිනය දා
සිනමාවේ සොඳුරු සටන් නළුවා රොබින් ප්‍රනාන්දු සුවදුක් සොයා සරසවිය ගිය ගමන

1937 births
2022 deaths
Sri Lankan male film actors
Sri Lankan male television actors
Sinhalese male actors
People from Colombo District
Neurological disease deaths in Sri Lanka
Deaths from Parkinson's disease